Erfurt Ost station is a railway station in the eastern part of Erfurt, capital city of Thuringia, Germany.

References

Ost
Buildings and structures in Erfurt